Amy Joy Wroe Bechtel (August 4, 1972 – disappeared July 24, 1997; declared legally dead 2004) is an American woman who disappeared while presumably jogging in the Wind River Mountains approximately  south of Lander, Wyoming. Despite extensive investigative work and media portrayals, her case remains unsolved . She was declared legally dead in 2004 at the behest of her husband, rock climber Steve Bechtel.

Background
Bechtel was born Amy Joy Wroe in Santa Barbara, California, in 1972. She graduated from the University of Wyoming, where she met her husband, Steve Bechtel. In college, Bechtel was a competitive long-distance runner and hoped to try out for the 2000 Summer Olympics.

Disappearance
On the morning of July 24, 1997, Bechtel told her husband, Steve, that she was planning on running several errands in town after teaching a children's weight-lifting class at the Wind River Fitness Center. She stopped at Camera Connection, a photo store near her home in Lander, around 2:30 p.m. after teaching her class. Following her time at the photo store, she stopped by Gallery 331, where she spoke to the proprietor, Greg Wagner. Wagner noted that Bechtel seemed hurried, and repeatedly glanced at her watch during their conversation. Wagner's was the last confirmed sighting of Bechtel.

After leaving the photo shop, it is believed by authorities that Bechtel drove to the Shoshone National Forest to practice the course of an upcoming 10K run she was enrolled to compete in. According to an eyewitness driving on Loop Road through the forest that afternoon, a woman resembling Bechtel was seen running along the road wearing black shorts similar to those she had worn earlier that day.

At 4:30 p.m., Steve returned home after having spent the day with a friend and found his wife absent. At 10:30 p.m., he called police to report his wife missing. At 1 a.m. on the morning of July 25, Bechtel's car, a white Toyota Tercel, was discovered parked on a turnout at Burnt Gulch in Lander.

Investigation
By 3 a.m. on July 25, 1997, an extensive search for Bechtel was underway from law enforcement, as well as Steve and the couple's friends and family. By July 27, police were receiving roughly 1,000 calls per day with tips and potential leads in Bechtel's disappearance; additionally, various lakes and mines were searched with no results.

Investigators initially believed Bechtel to have fallen victim to the elements or potentially been attacked by a bear or mountain lion; however, they later suspected Steve after uncovering a series of his journals describing violence toward women and, specifically, his wife. Detectives interrogated Steve on August 1, 1997, falsely claiming to have evidence proving he had murdered his wife; in response, Steve terminated the interview. He later said the journals had comprised song lyrics he had written for his band, and that they were unrelated to Bechtel or her disappearance. 

In 1998, local police stated that Bechtel was not a central suspect in the case, but that they had wanted to clear him of suspicion in order to follow other leads, which they were unable to do after his lack of cooperation. Steve provided an alibi for the time of Bechtel's disappearance, which was corroborated by friends who agreed they had spent the afternoon with him rock climbing. However, on the advice of criminal defense attorney Kent Spence, Steve refused to submit to a polygraph test. Additionally, a woman driving through the area from where Bechtel disappeared claimed to have seen a truck matching Steve's in the area.

In late August 1997, the FBI requested satellite photos from NASA of the area on the day of Bechtel's disappearance, but the satellite images provided no information. In January 1998, satellite images taken by the Russian space station Mir were also obtained by the FBI, but they also revealed nothing of note.

Later developments
In June 2003, a Timex Iron Man digital watch was discovered by a doctor hiking near the Popo Agie River and was turned in to police. It was noted to be similar to a watch Bechtel had owned at the time of her disappearance; however, law enforcement was unable to determine whether or not the watch belonged to her.

In a 2007 interview with the Billings Gazette, Sheriff Sgt. Roger Rizor stated: "I believe it was a homicide, and I believe what happened to her happened on the day she disappeared. In my mind there is only one person that I want to talk to, only one person who has refused to talk to law enforcement, and that's her husband."

Dale Wayne Eaton, a convicted murderer on Wyoming's death row, has also been cited as a suspect in the case. According to Eaton's brother, he had been near the area where Bechtel disappeared at the time of her disappearance. However, Eaton has refused to discuss the case.

Media depictions
Bechtel's case received significant media attention. On February 3, 1998, Steve appeared on The Geraldo Rivera Show with Bechtel's sisters, who pleaded with him to provide information regarding her disappearance. Steve denied any involvement in his wife's disappearance during the program.

The case was profiled in both People magazine and Outside in 1998, as well as the television series Unsolved Mysteries. It was later profiled on the series Disappeared in 2013, and was also the subject of an extensive article featured in Runner's World in 2016. Bechtel's disappearance is discussed in Jon Billman's 2020 book The Cold Vanish.

See also
List of people who disappeared

Notes

References

External links
Amy Wroe Bechtel at the Charley Project
Timeline of the Bechtel case at the Casper Star Tribune

1990s missing person cases
1997 in Wyoming
History of women in Wyoming
July 1997 events in the United States
Missing person cases in Wyoming